SV Erlbach is a German association football club from the municipality of Erlbach, Bavaria. The club's greatest success has been promotion to the tier five Bayernliga in 2015.

History
Formed in 1963, SV Erlbach played, for the most part of its history as a lower amateur side. The club won promotion of the Bezirksliga Oberbayern-Ost in 2004 and played at this level for two seasons before achieving another promotion, now to the tier six Bezirksoberliga Oberbayern. Der erfolgreichste Spieler war Bernhard Waldher. Erlbach played the next five seasons at this level, with two sixth places as its best results but was relegated again in 2011. Erlbach returned to the Bezirksliga for the next two seasons, finishing runners-up in 2012 and winning the league the season after. The latter earned it promotion to the Landesliga for the first time.

Erlbach played in the tier six Landesliga Bayern-Südost for the next two seasons, coming third in its first year there. In 2014–15 the club finished runners-up in the league and, after defeating SpVgg Landshut and FV Illertiseen II in the play-offs, was promoted to the southern division of the Bayernliga for the first time. SVE had to enter the relegation round after its inaugural Bayernliga season and, after two defeats against TSV Landsberg, was initially relegated back to the Landesliga but awarded another chance to stay in the Bayernliga through a play-off against VfL Frohnlach. Losing on aggregate to Frohnlach Erlbach was relegated back to the Landesliga.

Honours
The club's honours:
 Landesliga Bayern-Südost
 Runners-up: 2015
 Bezirksliga Oberbayern-Ost
 Champions: 2006, 2013
 Runners-up: 2005

Recent seasons
The recent season-by-season performance of the club:

 With the introduction of the Regionalligas in 1994 and the 3. Liga in 2008 as the new third tier, below the 2. Bundesliga, all leagues below dropped one tier.

References

External links
Official team site 
SV Erlbach at fupa.net 

Football clubs in Germany
Football clubs in Bavaria
Football in Upper Bavaria
Association football clubs established in 1963
1963 establishments in West Germany